Andrea Donnellan is a principal investigator at the Jet Propulsion Laboratory. She studies earthquakes using geodetic imaging.

Biography 
She studied at Ohio State University, University of Southern California, and California Institute of Technology.

In 1996 she was a recipient of a Presidential Early Career Award for Scientists and Engineers From 1998 to 2015, she taught at the University of Southern California. She teaches at California State Polytechnic University, Pomona.

She is an member of the editorial board of the Earth and Space Science journal

Most cited publications 
Tralli, D.M., Blom, R.G., Zlotnicki, V., Donnellan, A. and Evans, D.L., 2005. Satellite remote sensing of earthquake, volcano, flood, landslide and coastal inundation hazards. ISPRS Journal of Photogrammetry and Remote Sensing, 59(4), pp.185-198.  According to Google Scholar, this article has been cited 473 times.
Feigl, K.L., Agnew, D.C., Bock, Y., Dong, D., Donnellan, A., Hager, B.H., Herring, T.A., Jackson, D.D., Jordan, T.H., King, R.W. and Larsen, S., 1993. Space geodetic measurement of crustal deformation in central and southern California, 1984–1992. Journal of Geophysical Research: Solid Earth, 98(B12), pp.21677-21712.   According to Google Scholar, this article has been cited 342 times. 
Wei S, Avouac JP, Hudnut KW, Donnellan A, Parker JW, Graves RW, Helmberger D, Fielding E, Liu Z, Cappa F, Eneva M. The 2012 Brawley swarm triggered by injection-induced aseismic slip. Earth and Planetary Science Letters. 2015 Jul 15;422:115-25.  According to Google Scholar, this article has been cited 94 times.  
Holliday JR, Chen CC, Tiampo KF, Rundle JB, Turcotte DL, Donnellan A. A RELM earthquake forecast based on pattern informatics. Seismological Research Letters''. 2007 Jan 1;78(1):87-93.  According to Google Scholar, this article has been cited 93 times.

References 

American scientists
 Marie Byrd Land explorers and scientists
Living people
Year of birth missing (living people)
Recipients of the Presidential Early Career Award for Scientists and Engineers